Aphyocharax is a genus of characins from South America, specifically the Amazon, Orinoco, Essequibo, Paraguay and Paraná basins.  The 11 currently described species in this genus are: 
 Aphyocharax agassizii (Steindachner, 1882)
 Aphyocharax alburnus (Günther, 1869) (goldencrown tetra)
 Aphyocharax anisitsi C. H. Eigenmann & C. H. Kennedy, 1903 (bloodfin tetra)
 Aphyocharax colifax Taphorn & Thomerson, 1991
 Aphyocharax dentatus C. H. Eigenmann & C. H. Kennedy, 1903
 Aphyocharax erythrurus C. H. Eigenmann, 1912 (flame tail tetra)
 Aphyocharax gracilis Fowler, 1940
 Aphyocharax nattereri (Steindachner, 1882) * Note that Aphyocharax paraguayensis C. H. Eigenmann, 1915 (dawn tetra) is a synonym of A. nattereri. 

 Aphyocharax pusillus Günther, 1868
 Aphyocharax rathbuni C. H. Eigenmann, 1907 (redflank bloodfin)
 Aphyocharax yekwanae Willink, Chernoff & Machado-Allison, 2003

References

Characidae
Fish of South America
Taxa named by Albert Günther